Heaven's Rain is a 2010 American biographical drama film based on the true story of the lifelong quest of Brooks Douglass to bring his parents' killers and his sister's rapists to justice. The film is directed by Paul Brown, and was written by Brown and Douglass. The film debuted at the ArcLight Cinemas in Hollywood on September 9, 2010.

The title is taken from words spoken by Portia in Shakespeare's The Merchant of Venice:
The quality of mercy is not strain'd,   It droppeth as the gentle rain from heaven

The film was re-released in 2018 under the title The Amendment.

Plot
Following missionary work on the Amazon River in Brazil, Dr. Richard Douglass moved his family to the Oklahoma City area, becoming a well-respected Baptist minister to the large congregation of Putnam City Baptist Church.  His wife Marilyn was an accomplished singer and loving mother. The couple had two children, Brooks (16) and Leslie (12). On October 15, 1979, two drifters, Glen Ake and Steven Hatch entered their home, and tied the parents and Brooks. The intruders took 12-year-old Leslie into the bedroom, where both men raped her. After tying up Leslie, they shot all four family members, killing the parents and leaving the two siblings for dead.

The film is a story of forgiveness as primarily viewed from the perspective of Brooks.  Both Brooks and Leslie have endured through the horror of the crime, then dealing through the emotional consequences to eventually excel in their respective careers, he as a state legislator, businessman, producer and actor; she as a professional educator.

Cast
Mike Vogel as Brooks Douglass
Erin Chambers as Nicole
Taryn Manning as Leslie Douglass
Marilyn McIntyre as Margaret
Rebecca McCauley as Jackie
Casey Sander as Captain Larsen
Joshua Norman as Prison Guard
Silas Weir Mitchell as Ake
Brooks Douglass as Dr. Richard Douglass
Kelly Curran as Marilyn Douglass
Megan Paul as Heather
Nicholas Braico as Child Brooks
Taylor Pigeon as Child Leslie
Mollie Milligan as Julie Mitchell

Leslie Douglass appears as a Night Club Singer performing "Shenandoah".

Soundtrack
"Original Score"
Composer and Conducted by Maria Newman

"Shenandoah"
Words and Music in the Public Domain Worldwide
Performed by Wendy Page
Arranged by Charlton Pettus

"His Eye Is On The Sparrow"
Words by Civilla D. Martin
Music by Charles Hutchinson Gabriel
Performed by Wendy Page
Arranged by Charlton Pettus

"Down To The River To Pray"
Words and Music in the Public Domain Worldwide
Performed by Georgica Pettus
Arranged by Charlton Pettus

"Are We There"
Written by Lindsay Tomasic
Performed by Lindsay Tomasic
Published by Heavy Hitters

"Lounging With Ease"
Written by Michael Mandel
Performed by Mike Mandel
Published by Mopsy Music

"Shenandoah"
Words and Music in the Public Domain Worldwide
Performed by Leslie Douglass
Arranged by Charlton Pettus

"Tell Me What's Happening"
Written by Gaby Moreno
Performed by Gaby Moreno
Under License from Town Records, LLC

"Tracks Across The Sky"
Written by Todd Thibaud
Performed by Todd Thibaud
Published by Heavy Hitters

"Love, Reign O'er Me"
Written by Pete Townshend
Performed by The Who
Courtesy of Geffen Records and Polydor Ltd. (U.K.)
Under license from Universal Music Enterprises

"Love, Reign O'er Me"
Written by Pete Townshend
Performed by Taryn Manning
Published by: Universal Music Careers on behalf of Towser Tunes, Inc., Abkco Music, Inc. and Fabulous Music Ltd

"Love, Reign O'er Me"
Written by Pete Townshend
Performed by Gaby Moreno
Arranged by Charlton Pettus
Published by: Universal Music Careers on behalf of Towser Tunes, Inc., Abkco Music, Inc. and Fabulous Music Ltd

References

External links
 

2010 biographical drama films
2010 films
American biographical drama films
Films about murder
Films set in 1979
Films set in Oklahoma
Films shot in Oklahoma
2010 drama films
Films produced by Bobby Downes
2010s English-language films
2010s American films